520th may refer to:

520th Air Defense Group, disbanded United States Air Force organization
520th Fighter-Interceptor Squadron, inactive United States Air Force unit

See also
520 (number)
520 (disambiguation)
520, the year 520 (DXX) of the Julian calendar
520 BC